In the 1995-96 S.S.C. Napoli season, the club finished in the lower midfield of the table, once again missing out on the international competitions. Goalscoring was at a premium, but the tight defence led by Latin Americans Roberto Ayala and André Cruz, ensured that Napoli did not go close to relegation. Goalkeeper Giuseppe Taglialatela also strengthened his reputation with a solid season.

Squad

Transfers

Competitions

Serie A

League table

Results by round

Matches

Topscorers
  Arturo Di Napoli 5
  Massimo Agostini 4
  Fabio Pecchia 4
  Renato Buso 4
  Fausto Pizzi 3

Statistics

Players statistics

References

Sources
  RSSSF - Italy 1995/96

S.S.C. Napoli seasons
Napoli